"The Pit" is an indie rock song performed by American alternative rock music group Silversun Pickups. The song was written by Silversun Pickups, and produced by Jacknife Lee. It serves as the second single from their third studio album, Neck of the Woods, which was released on May 8, 2012. The song reached the top five of the Billboard Alternative Songs chart in March 2013, with a peak of number three.

Personnel
 Brian Aubert – guitar, vocals
 Chris Guanlao – drums
 Joe Lester – keys
 Nikki Monninger – bass, vocals

Chart performance

Weekly charts

Year-end charts

References

2012 singles
Silversun Pickups songs
Song recordings produced by Jacknife Lee
2012 songs